Sergio Aguza Santiago (born 2 September 1992) is a Spanish footballer who plays for CE Sabadell as a midfielder.

Club career

Real Madrid
Born in Sant Boi de Llobregat, Barcelona, Catalonia, after playing youth football with EF Gavà and UD Cornellà, Aguza joined Real Madrid's youth facilities in 2008, aged 16. In 2011–12 season Aguza made his senior debut, playing for the C-team in the Tercera División.

In July 2013, he was promoted to the reserves in the Segunda División.

On 8 September Aguza made his professional debut, starting in a 0–1 home loss against CD Mirandés. He scored his first goal on 15 February of the following year, netting his side's second in a 3–1 home success against FC Barcelona B.

Milton Keynes Dons
On 31 July 2015, Aguza signed for English Football League Championship side Milton Keynes Dons on a two-year deal. Aguza made his debut for the club on 11 August 2015 in the 2–1 Football League Cup win over Leyton Orient.

On 16 January 2016, following limited appearances for the club, Milton Keynes Dons announced that Aguza had left the club via mutual consent.

Ponferradina
On 18 January 2016, Aguza signed a two-and-a-half-year contract with SD Ponferradina, returning to Spain and its second level. He scored his first goal for the club on 20 March, in a 2–1 home win against SD Huesca, and added two more match-winners against CD Lugo and Albacete Balompié; at the end of the campaign, he suffered team relegation.

Alcorcón / Córdoba
On 7 July 2016, Aguza signed a one-year deal with AD Alcorcón also in the second level. The following 31 January he rescinded his contract, and signed a six-month deal with fellow league team Córdoba CF just hours later.

Almería
On 13 July 2018, Aguza signed a two-year contract with UD Almería, still in the second division. On 11 March 2020, he renewed his contract until 2023.

On 5 October 2020, Aguza joined FC Cartagena, newly-promoted to division two, on a one-year loan deal. The following 13 January, however, his loan was cut short, and he moved to fellow league team Ponferradina also in a temporary deal nine days later.

References

External links
 
 
 

1992 births
Living people
People from Baix Llobregat
Sportspeople from the Province of Barcelona
Spanish footballers
Footballers from Catalonia
Association football midfielders
Segunda División players
Segunda División B players
Tercera División players
Real Madrid C footballers
Real Madrid Castilla footballers
SD Ponferradina players
AD Alcorcón footballers
Córdoba CF players
UD Almería players
FC Cartagena footballers